Sutton Sting  is an English ice hockey team that plays in the English National Ice Hockey League, north division. It is based at the Lammas Leisure Centre at Sutton-in-Ashfield in Nottinghamshire, although the rink at that site is too small for match hockey so the team plays all home fixtures at IceSheffield instead. They also have a multiple junior teams which consist from U18s, u16s etc...

2009/10 English National Ice Hockey League North Two 6th of 7 clubs

2010/2011 English National Ice Hockey League North Two Runners Up

2011/2012 English National Ice Hockey League North Promotion Playoff Champions vs Nottingham Lions

Club roster 2020–21

External links
 Sutton Sting official site

Ice hockey teams in England
Sutton-in-Ashfield
Sport in Nottinghamshire